Ziyad Al-Jari (born 15 November 2001) is a Saudi Arabian professional footballer who plays as a centre back for Pro League side Al-Fateh.

Career
Al-Jari began his career at the youth team of Al-Fateh. On 19 August 2020, he was called up to the bench for the first time. On 7 July 2021, Al-Jari signed his first professional contract with the club. On 23 October 2021, Al-Jari made his debut for Al-Fateh starting in the 3–1 loss against Abha.

References

External links 
 

2001 births
Living people
Saudi Arabian footballers
People from Al-Hasa
Association football defenders
Al-Fateh SC players
Saudi Professional League players
Saudi Arabia youth international footballers